There's Nothing but Space, Man! is the debut studio album by English singer-songwriter Sam Ryder, released on 9 December 2022 through Parlophone Records. Primarily a pop and pop rock record with elements of various genres including dance-pop and folk, it was largely co-written by Ryder, with producers such as TMS, Red Triangle, and Jamie Hartman. The album features appearances from David Guetta and Sigala. 

There's Nothing but Space, Man! received generally positive reviews from critics, with praise towards his versatility and vocal performance. It was supported by four singles, including "Space Man", which came second in the Eurovision Song Contest 2022 and also peaked at number two in the UK. The album debuted atop the UK Albums Chart, becoming the first debut album by a British male solo artist in over three years to debut at number one. It has been certified Silver by the British Phonographic Industry (BPI).

Background 
In an interview for Variety, Ryder stated that he had begun writing for his album before competing in the Eurovision Song Contest 2022, with alterations being made following the contest. In a interview for Rolling Stone UK, he described There's Nothing but Space, Man! as an album about "focusing on the idea of retaining hope and faith and that's been a massive part of my journey. The album is about the idea of once you've found that thing, never ceasing to grab onto it, never giving up and following that journey and path."

Following his Eurovision participation, Ryder started to tease the release date for his debut album. In an interview for NME, he stated that in 2021 he wrote over 100 songs for his album, with many of them not making the final cut. On 16 August, he was announced as one of the artist ambassadors for National Album Day, which in 2022 would celebrate debut albums.

On 5 September 2022, he announced on his social media pages and in an open letter to his fans that his upcoming debut studio album There's Nothing but Space, Man! would be released on 18 November 2022. On the same day the track listing was also revealed. In the letter, Ryder wrote:"This year for myself and the team has been one filled with so many blessings, opportunities and dreams come to fruition. To create a body of work throughout this time representing aspects of our journey feels like the highest honour and a beautiful way to redirect the flow of energy back to the people who are making this whirlwind possible – you. Biggest thank yous, and I hope you enjoy it!".

However, the release date was later delayed to 9 December 2022. There's Nothing but Space, Man! features 14 tracks, including "Living Without You" with Sigala and David Guetta as a bonus track. The track listing includes the previously released singles "Space Man" and "Somebody", as well as "Tiny Riot", "More" and "Whirlwind", which are from his extended play The Sun's Gonna Rise. The album was available to pre-order on Ryder's website in different bundles including vinyl, CD, and cassette.

Composition 
The album consists of fourteen tracks, and was co-written by the singer himself, with the participation of writers and producers, including TMS, Red Triangle, and Jamie Hartman. It also features collaborations with David Guetta and Sigala.

The albums lyrics explores various themes including empowerment, anxiety, love. fear, with inspiration by Ryder's own journey with hardships as a performer in the industry while retaining hope and faith. Musically, it incorporates various sounds including pop, pop rock, dance pop, folk, rock, soul, electropop, gospel, and electro rock.

Promotion 
On 26 September 2022, Ryder performed tracks from the album live at Lafayette in London for National Album Day, in partnership with the charity War Child. He then went on to tour the album, firstly around Europe in October and November 2022, and then around the UK and Ireland in early 2023. Ryder also played tracks from his album as part of the 2022 BBC New Year's Eve specials event.

Critical reception 

Writing for NME, Nick Levine described the album as a collection of consistently melodic and mostly mid-tempo pop-rock songs. He wrote "Ryder's voice is capable of being gritty in its lower register and recalling Freddie Mercury at its high end is what makes this debut album pop. He drew praise to his vocal ability commenting that "Ryder sounds terrific whether he's delivering a fist-pumping anthem ('Tiny Riot'), a stripped-back ballad ('Whirlwind') or a soulful stomper with a Brian May-style guitar solo ('Two Tons')." He further highlighted that "his infectious likeability shines through at all times", ending with how "There’s Nothing but Space, Man! sounds like the beginning of what could be a really stellar career".

In The Daily Telegraph, Neil McCormick praised Ryder for his versatility and vocal performance, adding "He has a fantastic falsetto, full and powerful rather than the tremulous squeaky thing heard when so many contemporary singers push themselves to the edge of their range." He highlighted "Tiny Riot" and "Whirlwind" as standout singles, with praise drawn towards the album lyrics.

Laura Snapes for The Guardian wrote a mixed review. She wrote "he shines mostly strongly in the softer songs: the lovely 'Whirlwind' has something of the silvery haze of Taylor Swift's Folklore while Ryder sings about anxiety and devotion. The waltzing 'Lost in You' is similarly vulnerable, about the butterfly effects that lead to love."

Commercial performance 
The album debuted atop the UK Albums Chart, making Ryder the first British male solo artist to debut at number one with their debut album since Sam Fender's Hypersonic Missiles (2019), and also the first time a solo artist had debuted at number one since Olivia Rodrigo's Sour (2021). In its first week the album also had the most physical sales and digital downloads of the week, and was the best-selling album in UK independent record shops.

Singles 
Lead single "Space Man" was co-written by Ryder along with Amy Wadge and Max Wolfgang in London, during the COVID-19 pandemic, before being chosen to represent the United Kingdom at the Eurovision Song Contest 2022. The song peaked at number two on the UK Singles Chart following the contest, becoming the highest-charting UK Eurovision entry since Gina G's "Ooh Aah... Just a Little Bit" in 1996. It has been certified gold by the British Phonographic Industry (BPI).

On 19 August 2022, "Somebody" was released as the album's second single, peaking at number number 77 in the UK. It marked Ryder's first release since the Eurovision Song Contest, with him describing it as a song about "the joy of giving love and experiencing love". On 2 September 2022, "Living Without You", a collaboration with Sigala and David Guetta, was released and is included on the album. It has been described as a house-inspired EDM track and was first teased by the trio during a performance in August, in Ibiza. On 4 November 2022, "All the Way Over" was released as the album's fourth single. It has been described as a "heartfelt piano ballad"; in a press release, Ryder called it "a song for anybody on a journey to the other side of loss, grief or heartache".

Track listing

Notes
  – production and vocal production
  – additional production
  – executive production
  – vocal production

Personnel
Musicians

 Sam Ryder – vocals (all tracks), guitar (tracks 1, 13), backing vocals (3)
 Peter Kelleher – backing vocals, piano (1)
 Vanessa Kohn – backing vocals (1)
 Nik Woodham – bass (1)
 Tom Barnes – drum programming (1)
 Vern Asbury – guitar (1)
 Nir Zidkyahu – live drums (1)
 Jimmy Napes – piano (1)
 Max Wolfgang – piano (1), backing vocals (3)
 Ben Kohn – synthesizer (1)
 Mark Ralph – drum programming (2); drums, keyboards, programming (5–7, 11); bass, guitar (7)
 Koz – programming (2, 4); drums, guitar, percussion, synthesizer (2)
 Clarence Coffee Jr. – backing vocals, percussion (3)
 Jon Greene – backing vocals (3)
 Nathaniel Ledwidge – bass, drums (3)
 Dan Ewins – percussion (3)
 Dan Bingham – piano (5)
 Dan Grech-Marguerat – programming (5–9, 11, 13), additional programming (12)
 Lorna Blackwood – backing vocals (7, 9, 11)
 Tre Jean-Marie – bass, drums, organ, programming, synthesizer (9, 13); backing vocals, piano, strings (9)
 Levi Yarde – bass (9, 13)
 Magnus Klausen – guitar (9, 13)
 Ben Noke – piano (9, 13)
 Fred Cox – backing vocals (9)
 Heather Chelan – backing vocals (9)
 Lewis Allen – guitar (9)
 George Tizzard – acoustic guitar, drums, gang vocals (10)
 Freedo – bass, drum programming, guitar, piano, strings programming, snythesizer (10)
 Rick Parkhouse – bass, electric guitar, gang vocals (10)
 Anna Phoebe – strings, string arrangement (10)
 Eos Counsell – violin (10)
 Nayla Sillkey Nyassa – strings (13)

Technical

 Miles Showell – mastering (1–3, 5–7, 9, 11, 13)
 Randy Merrill – mastering (4, 8, 10)
 Mark "Spike" Stent – mixing (1)
 Dan Grech-Marguerat – mixing (2, 5–13)
 Serban Ghenea – mixing (3)
 Matty Green – mixing (4)
 Bryce Bordone – mix engineering (3)
 Claude Vause – engineering (1)
 Matt Snell – engineering (2)
 Josh Green – engineering (5–7, 11)
 Gemma Chester – engineering (5, 7, 11), engineering assistance (6)
 Freedo – engineering (10)
 Charles Haydon Hicks – engineering (13), mixing assistance (5–11)
 Luke Burgoyne – engineering (13), mixing assistance (5–10), additional mixing (11)
 Chris Bishop – vocal engineering (1)
 Jake Skinner – vocal engineering (3)
 Matt Wolach – mixing assistance (1)
 Sam Ryder – additional vocal engineering (10)

Charts

Certifications

Tour dates

Notes

References

2022 debut albums
Sam Ryder (singer) albums
Parlophone albums